The Sri Lankan diaspora are Sri Lankan emigrants and expatriates from Sri Lanka, and their descendants, that reside in a foreign country. They number a total estimated population of around 3 million.

Expatriate workers
Expatriate workers to Sri Lankan have been a valuable export for the country. The number of expatriate workers have been ever growing as well as the remittances they send back. In 2009 Sri Lankans sent home US$3.3 billion, a US$400 million increase from the year before. It is expected that 2010 would exceed US$4 billion. In mid-2010 there were more than 1.8 million Sri Lankan expatriate workers.

Diaspora experience

Discrimination
In Australia, under the White Australia policy, immigration was negligible. It resumed after the Second World War primarily involving migration of Burghers, who fulfilled the then criteria that they should be of predominantly European ancestry and that their appearance should be European. Sinhalese migration began in the 1960s but it was after the mid-1970s that large groups arrived, which also included Christians and Buddhists. Sri Lankan students undertook courses in Australia as part of the Colombo Plan prior to the formal dismantling of the White Australia policy, and after 1973, Sinhalese, Tamil and Moor migration resumed.

Assimilation
The rate of assimilation among Sri Lankan Australians is fairly high: among second-generation immigrants, the 'in-marriage' rate was extremely low - 5.6% for women and 3.0% for men.

Distribution by continent

Africa

Botswana
According to The United Nations, there were 110,596 international migrants in Botswana and in that number 992 of them were from Sri Lanka.

Libya
Libya's 2007 census says that there are over 15,010 workers from Sri Lanka. Sri Lankan Sinhalese make up two-thirds of the buddhist population of Libya.

Mauritius
Sri Lanka (Ceylon) and Mauritius were former British and Dutch colonies but the presence of Sri Lankans in Mauritius goes back to between 1819 and 1832 during the British Period when Sinhalese nobles were exiled to Mauritius from the result of the Kandyan wars.
The total number of Mauritians with Sri Lankan descent is 5,000 which 80% of them are Sinhalese.

Seychelles
Sri Lankans make up around 2.5% of the population in the Seychelles where the number is at 2,200. It is said that the  first Sri Lankans to reach the Seychelles was in 1967 where 6 fisherman from Sri Lanka came to the Seychelles on a sailing vessel. Today, many Sri Lankans in the Seychelles are working as professionals.

South Africa
During the era of The Dutch Empire, both Sri Lanka (Ceylon) and South Africa had its connection. In the 17th and 18th centuries, the Dutch brought slaves from Ceylon and those slaves mixed with the population. In the Cape during the early 18th century about half of the slaves came from India and Ceylon. The ethnic groups which have roots of descent from Ceylon are the Cape Malays and the Cape coloured. The number of Sri Lankans in South Africa is unknown.

Tanzania
Sri Lankan people have came to work in Tanzania during the British colonial rule of the early 20th Century. The workers from Sri Lanka (then Ceylon) established the first buddhist temple in the country.

Americas

Bermuda

In 1979 there were only 6 Sri Lankans living in Bermuda. As of 2005 there are an estimated 400 living and working there mainly as professionals

Canada

Sri Lankan Canadians include members from all ethnicities of Sri Lanka, they are mainly concentrated in the cities of Toronto and Montreal, in the provinces of Ontario and Quebec. As of 2006 there are 103,625 Sri Lankans in Canada.

United States

There are tens of thousands of Sri Lankans in the United States from all different backgrounds. In the 1990s the number was about 14,448, however this has grown significantly. Sri Lankan American communities are mainly situated in large metropolitan areas. The New York City Metropolitan Area contains the largest Sri Lankan community in the United States, receiving the highest legal permanent resident Sri Lankan immigrant population, followed by Central New Jersey and the Los Angeles metropolitan area. The Little Sri Lanka in the Tompkinsville neighborhood of the borough of Staten Island in New York City is one of the largest Sri Lankan communities outside of the country of Sri Lanka itself.

Asia

India

There are an estimated 200,000 Sri Lankans in India, most of them being refugees. Nearly all of them are Sri Lankan Tamils but there are also a small amount of Sinhalese as well. Most Sri Lankans in India reside in and around the southern state of Tamil Nadu with some small populations in the big cites like Delhi and Chennai. The vast majority of the population however, mostly Sri Lankan Tamils, live in refugee camps due to the Sri Lankan Civil War.

Japan

As of 2020 there were 27,735 Sri Lankan nationals residing in Japan.

Malaysia and Singapore

Ceylonese Tamils made up an overwhelming majority in the civil service of British Malaya and Singapore prior to independence. It was in Malaysia and Singapore, that the term Ceylonese and Jaffnese were popularly used by the Sri Lankan Tamils to differentiate themselves from the larger Malaysian Indian population who were predominantly of Tamil origin.

After the Pangkor Treaty of 1874, the British embarked upon the construction of roads, railways, schools, hospitals, and government offices in the Malay Peninsula, to develop the country and to increase its revenue.

"It was to meet those early problems that Malaya looked to its older sister Ceylon for help and probably, the then Governor of the Straits Settlements secured the despatch to Perak of the 2nd division of the Ceylon Pioneer Corp. "So it fell to the Ceylonese to survey the railways and to build and man them, to be apothecaries in the hospitals, to be technical assistants to qualified engineers and to staff the clerical services on which an expanding government was bound increasingly to depend.

In Kuala Lumpur, the Ceylon Tamil population was mainly concentrated in Brickfields and Sentul because of the proximity of the Administrative Centre of the Malayan Railway (opposite the railway station) and the Sentul Workshop. The Government provided accommodation for the white and the blue collar workers in these areas. The Ceylon Tamils living in both these areas were devout Saivites and as they fervently believed that "no one should live in a place that has no Temple ", they soon began to organize themselves into Associations. This gave birth to the Sri Kandaswamy Kovil, Brickfields, which has become a landmark and tourist attraction in the city, showcasing Sri Lankan Tamil and Hindu architecture at its finest.

Many of the first Asian and non-white doctors and engineers in Malaya and Singapore were of Sri Lankan Tamil descent. The world's first Asian surgeon was Dr S.S. Thiruchelvam, a Malayan of Ceylonese Tamil origin.

Former Singaporean Prime Minister Lee Kuan Yew once said:

The Ceylonese community established many schools, banks, cultural societies, cooperatives and temples in Malaysia and Singapore. Some good examples would be the Jaffnese Cooperative Society, Vivekananda Ashrama and the Vivekananda Tamil School in Brickfields, Kuala Lumpur. In 1958 The Malaysian Ceylonese Congress was established as a political party with the aim of giving support to the then Alliance party. MCC has continuously supported the Barisan Nasional and the Government. It was formed to promote and preserve the Political, Educational, Social and Cultural aspects of the Malaysian Ceylonese Community. To date MCC has seen six President's:
 1. Mr. M.W Navaratnam AMN,JP  (1958–1969)
 2. Senator Tan Sri Datuk Dr. C.Sinnadurai PSD,PNBS,DPMP,MN,SMK,SMB,PJK (1970–1983)
 3. Tan Sri Dato' Seri V.Jeyaratnam PSM,SPM,STP,JP (1983–1987)
 4. Dato' Dr N.Arumugasamy DSIJ,JSM (1988–1995)
 5. Dato' Dr D.M.Thuraiappah SPM,AMN,ASA (1996–2003)
 6. Dato 'Dr NKS Tharmaseelan DPTJ,PMC,ANS (2004 – present)

Today MCC makes its way in this ever-changing globe under the dynamic leadership of Dato Dr NKS Tharmaseelan. After 50 years of hibernation MCC has now become visible. The MCC was formally registered with the Malaysian Election's Commission (SPR) on 27 February 2009.

Many Ceylonese were also involved in the independence movements in Malaya and Singapore. In Singapore, there are many current and past ministers who are of Ceylonese Tamil in origin and Tamil is a national language. Sinnathamby Rajaratnam was the former foreign minister and deputy prime minister of Singapore and regarded as one of the founding fathers of Singapore. His death in 2006 was marked with a state funeral by the government of Singapore. The Singapore flag was flown at half mast at all public buildings and former Prime Minister and friend Lee Kuan Yew cried when giving his eulogy.

Even today, the Sri Lankan community in Malaysia and Singapore is an upwardly mobile community taking up many professional and government posts. One of Malaysia's and South East Asia's richest men is billionaire Tan Sri Ananda Krishnan, who regularly makes it to Forbes magazine's billionaire list.

Philippines
According to the 2010 census, there are about 146 Sri Lankan expats in the Philippines. During the age of Spanish colonialism in the Philippines, Sri Lankans were used as imported slave labour and those slaves interacted with the Minnanese, Tagalogs and Kampaganans of Central Luzon.

Middle East
Sri Lankans generally go to the Middle East to find work. For Sri Lankans Saudi Arabia is the largest "unskilled and semi-skilled labour" importing country, ahead of Qatar, Kuwait and the United Arab Emirates.

Lebanon

There are approximately 80,000 to 90,000 Sri Lankans in Lebanon. There is a large domestic labour population in Lebanon.

Qatar
As of 2016 December, there are 145,256 Sri Lankans living and working in Qatar.

Saudi Arabia
As of 2007 there were approximately 400,000 Sri Lankans in Saudi Arabia. During January 2010 up until October 56,000 workers have left for Saudi Arabia, however thousands have runaway or escaped from their employers due to ill-treatment or when found that they had been duped by unscrupulous job agents.

United Arab Emirates

There are an estimated population of over 300,000 they mostly form the country's large foreign labour force. Most expatriates from Sri Lanka, along with other immigrants from the Indian subcontinent, tend to be found in Dubai, although sizeable communities are existent in Abu Dhabi, Sharjah, Al-Ain and Ras al-Khaimah.

Europe

Denmark
Denmark has 11,700 Sri Lankans residing in its borders as of 2017. Additionally 2,593 Sri Lankan nationals were living in Denmark 2010.

France

As of 2017 estimation, there are 52,300 Sri Lankan born population live in France. In only 10 years, "Little Jaffna", located at the last stretch of the winding street of Rue du Faubourg Saint-Denis in the 10th arrondissement, between metros Gare du Nord and La Chapelle, has sprung to life and begun to truly flourish. It is commonly mistakenly called by the average Parisian as Little Bombay. 

The vast majority of Parisian Tamils fled Sri Lanka as refugees in the 1980s, escaping the violent civil conflict. The French Prefecture was initially quite reluctant about granting asylum to Tamils. In 1987, the Office for the Protection of Refugees (OFPRA) gained in power and opened up a period of nearly systematic asylum. This liberal period eventually tapered off in the 90s as a result of new European measures designed against an influx in immigration. Little Jaffna is also famous for the annual chariot procession held during Ganesha Chathurthi. Both the area and event have become popular tourist attractions.

Germany

There are about 25,900 Sri Lankans living Germany as of 2019.

Religious fervor among Tamil Germans intensified as their numbers swelled. Due to the inspirational encouragement of Hawaii Subramaniaswami – the disciple of Yoga Swamigal – two well-organized Hindu temples – Sidhivinayagar Kovil and the kamadchi Amman Kovil – having place in the city of Hamm since 1984. According to the journal Hinduism Today, the youth are being well trained in their religion and culture at home and in weekend schools in rented halls using texts from Sri Lanka. They even wear Hindu symbols of Vibuthi and Tilakam. 

The second and third generations of Tamils have integrated very well into the German society, contributing in all skilled professions. Tamils are known as hard workers. The identity of Hindus can be seen in city Hamm, where the temple was built with 17-meter-high Gopuram and the layout rebuilt in Germany after Kamadchi-Ampal Temple in South India.

Italy

There have been sources of Sri Lankan presence in Italy since the Roman times as according to historian Pliny, 4 people from Sri Lanka was said to have visited the court of Emperor Claudius in AD 50 while another delegation was sent from Sri Lanka to Rome under the reign of Emperor Julian in 375 AD.

It is estimated that there are 110,000 Sinhalese in Italy in 2019 (tuttitalia site). The major Sinhalese communities in Italy are located in Lombardia (In the districts Loreto and Lazzaretto), Milan, Lazio, Rome, Naples and Southern Italy (Particularly Palermo, Messina and Catania). Most Italian Sinhalese work as domestic workers. But they have also opened businesses such as restaurants, cleaning enterprises (e.g. Cooperativa Multietnica di Pulizie
Sud-Est), call centres, video-shops, traditional food shops and minimarkets.

Many Sinhalese have migrated to Italy since the 1970s. Italy was attractive to the Sinhalese due to perceived easier employment opportunities and entry, compared to other European countries.

In the late 70's, Sinhalese Catholic women migrated to Italy to work in elderly homes. This was followed by a wave of Sinhalese migrants who worked for Italian  entrepreneurs in the early 80s. Italy was often seen as a temporary destination, but many Sinhalese decided to settle there. Many Sinhalese have also illegally migrated to Italy, mainly through the Balkans and Austria.

Admission acts also encouraged more Sinhalese to migrate to Italy. For example, the Dini Decree in 1996 made it more easier for Sinhalese workers to bring their family to Italy. In Rome, Naples and Milan, the Sinhalese have built up "enlarged families", where jobs are exchanged among relatives and compatriots.

The Sinhalese prefer to send their children to English speaking countries for their education and consider Italian education mediocre.

The major organisation representing the Sinhalese in Italy is the Sri Lanka Association Italy.

The Sri Lanka - Italy Business Council - Ceylon Chamber of Commerce is an organization in Italy for promoting investment, trade and joint venture between the two countries.

Netherlands
In 2017, there were 12,696 Sri Lankans in the Netherlands, with just over 5,700 of them second generation Sri Lankans in the Netherlands. There were 5,500 men and a thousand less women in 2010.

Norway
As of 1 January 2010 Statistics Norway recorded 13,772 Sri Lankans living in Norway, an increase of 339 from the year before. The capital city Oslo is home to about 7,000 Sri Lankans while Norway's second largest city Bergen has about a thousand Sri Lankan residents.

Sweden
Sweden has a Sri Lankan population of about 6,733 as of 2010. There were 2,948 men and 3,774 women.

Switzerland

There are about 46,000 to 55,000 Swiss of Sri Lankan origin and Sri Lankan expatriates are living in Switzerland, with around 32,000 to 42,000 home to Sri Lanka Tamils.

United Kingdom

Sri Lankans have been migrating to Britain for several generations, up from the time of British ruled Ceylon (started in the 19th century). They include Sri Lankans of all ethnicities and backgrounds and boast a large population in the country. In 2021, the estimated population of the UK born in Sri Lanka was 131,000. Most Sri Lankans live in London, South East England, East England and The Midlands. However, the number of people of Sri Lankan descent might be around 300,000-400,000.

Oceania

Australia

The 2006 Census in Australia found that there were approximately 29,055 Sinhalese Australians (0.1 percent of the population). That was an addition of 8,395 Sinhalese Australians (a 40.6 percent increase) from the 2001 Census. There are 73,849 Australians (0.4 of the population) who reported having Sinhalese ancestry in 2006. This was 26 percent more in 2001, in which 58,602 Australia reported having Sinhalese ancestry. The census is counted by Sri Lankans who speak the Sinhalese language at home.

Because the Australian Bureau of Statistics (ABS) uses Sinhalese as opposed to Sri Lankan as the category to define ancestry, it is hard to estimate the number of Tamil Sri Lankans currently living in Australia

New Zealand

The early arrivals to come to New Zealand from what was then British Ceylon were a few prospectors attracted to the gold rushes. By 1874 there were a mere 33 New Zealand residents born in Ceylon.

The numbers arriving continued to increase, and at the 2013 census there were over 11,000 Sri Lankans living in New Zealand.

Sri Lankan New Zealanders comprised 3% of the Asian population of New Zealand in 2001. Out of the Asians, the Sri Lankans were the most likely to hold a formal qualification and to work in white-collar occupations. Sri Lankans mainly worked in health professions, business and property services, and the retail and manufacturing sectors, in large numbers. Most lived in Auckland and Wellington, with smaller populations in Waikato, Manawatu, Canterbury and others.

Returning
Sri Lankan expatriates have a low rate of return migration to Sri Lanka, even though many continue to maintain close ties with their home country. Though there have been cases where most migrated back to their homeland at least some point in their life.

Notable members of the diaspora

 List of Sri Lankan Americans
 List of Sri Lankan Australians
 List of Sri Lankan Britons
 List of Sri Lankan Canadians
 List of Sri Lankan Indians
 List of Sri Lankans in Singapore
 List of Sri Lankan New Zealanders

See also
 Sinhalese Diaspora
 List of Sri Lanka Tamils for more members of the diaspora

References

External links
 International Network of Sri Lankan diaspora